DeMario Pressley (born November 3, 1985) is a former American football defensive tackle. He was drafted by the New Orleans Saints in the fifth round of the 2008 NFL Draft. He played college football at North Carolina State.

Pressley was also a member of the Houston Texans, Indianapolis Colts, Denver Broncos, and Carolina Panthers.

Professional career 
On February 22, 2011, Pressley was acquired by the Colts after being waived by Houston, but was waived on August 16. He was claimed by Denver the next day but later released. Pressley was promoted to the active roster of the Carolina Panthers on December 30, 2011, played in the final game of the season, then was waived on March 16, 2012.

On April 11, 2012, Pressley signed with the Bears.

On August 21, 2012, Pressley was waived/injured by the Bears, and subsequently reverted to injured reserve on August 22.

References

External links 

 DeMario Pressley at the NC State Wolfpack website
 DeMario Pressley at the NFL website

1985 births
Living people
Players of American football from Greensboro, North Carolina
American football defensive tackles
NC State Wolfpack football players
New Orleans Saints players
Houston Texans players
Indianapolis Colts players
Denver Broncos players
Carolina Panthers players
Chicago Bears players